is a former Japanese football player.

Playing career
Hada was born in Hiroshima Prefecture on June 27, 1981. After graduating from high school, he joined J1 League club Nagoya Grampus Eight in 2000. However he could not play at all in the match until 2002. In September 2002, he moved to J2 League club Mito HollyHock. He became a regular player in 2003 and played many matches as midfielder. However his opportunity to play decreased in 2006. In 2007, he moved to Japan Football League (JFL) club FC Ryukyu. He played as regular player until 2010. In 2011, he moved to JFL club MIO Biwako Shiga. He played many matches in 2011. However he could hardly play in the match in 2012. In 2013, he moved to Regional Leagues club Okinawa Kaiho Bank. He retired end of 2013 season.

Club statistics

References

External links

1981 births
Living people
Association football people from Hiroshima Prefecture
Japanese footballers
J1 League players
J2 League players
Japan Football League players
Nagoya Grampus players
Mito HollyHock players
FC Ryukyu players
MIO Biwako Shiga players
Association football midfielders